Callimedusa is a genus of frogs belonging to the subfamily Phyllomedusinae. The species of this genus are found in South America.

Species
The following species are recognised in the genus Callimedusa :

Callimedusa atelopoides 
Callimedusa baltea 
Callimedusa duellmani 
Callimedusa ecuatoriana 
Callimedusa perinesos 
Callimedusa tomopterna

References

Phyllomedusinae
Amphibian genera